The 2004 Virginia Cavaliers football team represented the University of Virginia in the 2004 NCAA Division I-A football season. The team's head coach was Al Groh. They played their home games at Scott Stadium in Charlottesville, Virginia.

Schedule
a

Personnel

References

Virginia
Virginia Cavaliers football seasons
Virginia Cavaliers football